Marco Antonio Martos (born December 14, 1973) is a Mexican former wide receiver and kickoff returner in American football, who played eight seasons in the NFL Europe League for the Barcelona Dragons and Cologne Centurions.

Martos is the second all-time, all-purpose yards gainer in NFL Europe history. He also played in preseason games for the Denver Broncos, Dallas Cowboys and Carolina Panthers of the National Football League.

College career
Martos began his football career at the Universidad de las Américas, Puebla, only a few miles from Mexico City. He spent five seasons (1992–96) with the Aztecas UDLAP as a starting wide receiver. In 1995, Martos led the team to their first-ever ONEFA national championship, and its first national title overall since 1949. The following year, he completed his college career with another ONEFA championship.

Coaching career
Martos served as the head coach of the college football team Leones Anáhuac Cancún in Cancún, Mexico from 2005 to 2018. He cited personal issues as the reason for his departure, wanting to spend more time with his four children.

References

External links
 Cologne Centurions bio
 Marco Martos career stats
 NFL Europa player records

1973 births
Living people
American football return specialists
American football wide receivers
Aztecas UDLAP players
Coaches of American football
Barcelona Dragons players
Carolina Panthers players
Cologne Centurions (NFL Europe) players
Dallas Cowboys players
Denver Broncos personnel
Sportspeople from Mexico City
Mexican players of American football
Mexican expatriate sportspeople in Spain
Mexican expatriate sportspeople in the United States
Mexican expatriate sportspeople in Germany
Expatriate players of American football
Mexican sports coaches